The Nandu River is the longest river in Hainan Province, China. Its tributary is the Xinwu River. The river discharges into the Nandu River estuary at Haikou city, and then into Qiongzhou Strait.

The river is 314 km long, with a discharge of 6.099 billion cubic metres. It passes the major settlements of Chengmai Zhen in Chengmai County then Dingcheng in Ding'an County. The river then turns north, goes over the Longtang Dam at Longtang, a somewhat smaller town than Chengmai and Ding'an. The Nandu then goes under several bridges, such as the Nandu River Iron Bridge and Qiongzhou Bridge. Once passed the Qiongzhou Bridge, at the southern tip of Xinbu Island, the Nandu flows north along the east side of Xinbu Island and out into the sea. At the southern tip of Xinbu Island, two distributaries branch off. One is the Henggouhe Channel which runs along the west side of Xinbu Island. The other is the smaller Haidian River which flows westward, under the Haikou Century Bridge, and out into Haikou Bay.

Bridges

From Chengmai Zhen in Chengmai County at the west to its mouth at Haikou there are numerous bridges crossing the Nandu River. Some are semi-permanent and get washed out during times of high water, while other, major bridges are currently under construction. The following is a fairly comprehensive list of landmarks and bridges between Chengmai Zhen and Haikou City.

Flooding

The Nandu occasionally floods its banks. For that reason, preventative measures have been taken. For example, near Haikou and in other parts, levees were built, and flood walls were constructed on the west bank near Dingcheng.

One instance of flooding occurred at a sharp bend in the river at Bushicun village. There in August 2016, on the outside bend, as it had before, water surged and flooded onto the land. The ground there, several metres above normal river level, is strewn with rusted boat hulls from previous floods.

Gallery

See also
List of rivers in China
Haikou Nandu River Water Diversion Project

References

External links 

 Table of rivers in China with Chinese names and useful data

 Kayaking in Haikou's Nandu River

Rivers of Hainan